Home at Last is an album of mostly new material by Larry Norman first issued in 1989. It was originally released as a two-LP album and included some live tracks. It was reissued in 1998 as one album together with the 1994 compilation Footprints in the Sand. The 2007 re-release of Home at Last contained only the studio recordings of the original issue. It was released to mixed reviews, some citing disorganization and uneven production, and controversy. A music video of live performances of the 14 studio songs on Home at Last garnered a favourable review.

Track listing 

Original double-LP release

 Side 1 
 "Lonely Boy"
 "My Feet Are on the Rock"
 "Country Church, Country People"
 "Sitting In My Kitchen"

 Side 2 
 "Camel Through a Needle's Eye"
 "Nightmare #49 (Part 1)"
 "Oh, How I Love You"
 "Queen of the Rodeo"
 "He Really Loves You"
 "Here Comes the King"

 Side 3 
 "Letters to the Church"
 "We Three Twogether"
 "Somewhere Out There"
 "Selah"
 "Nightmare #49 (Instrumental Mix)"

 Side 4 (live) 
 "Letters to the Church"
 "Camel Through a Needle's Eye"
 "Surprise With Candles"
 "Here Comes the King"
 "Shake Your Rattle and Crawl"

 2007 CD re-issue 
(Solid Rock Records)
 "Lonely Boy"
 "My Feet Are on the Rock"
 "Country Church"
 "Sitting In My Kitchen"
 "Camel Through a Needle's Eye"
 "Nightmare #49 (Part One)"
 "Oh How I Love You"
 "Queen of the Rodeo"
 "He Really Loves You"
 "Here Comes the King"
 "Letters to the Church"
 "We Three Twogether"
 "Somewhere Out There"
 "Selah"

Personnel 
 Larry Norman – vocals, harmonies, keyboards, acoustic piano, guitars, saxophone, harmonica
 Charles Norman – vocals, keyboards, synthesizers, lead guitar, rhythm guitars, slide guitar, bass, drums, percussion, harmonica
 Sarah Norman – vocals, harmonies, percussion

Additional musicians
 John Campbell – keyboards (6, 9)
 Dan Cutrona – keyboards (11)
 Steve Goomas – acoustic piano (13)
 Bob Somma – lead guitar (6), rhythm guitar (9, 13)
 Jon Linn – lead guitar (9)
 Jellybean Jaquette – bass (3, 6, 9, 11, 13)
 Dave Spurr – drums (6, 9, 11, 13)

Production 
 Larry Norman – producer, arrangements, mixing 
 Jellybean Jaquette – engineer, mixing 
 Charles Norman – mixing 
 Mark Heard – mixing 
 Jeff Frickman – mix assistant (1-10, 12, 13, 14)
 Brian Levi – mix assistant (1-10, 12, 13, 14)
 Jon Linn – mix assistant (11)

See also 
 Larry Norman discography

References 

1989 albums
Larry Norman albums